Richard Allan Ream (born August 8, 1961), better known by the stage name Rikki Rockett, is an American drummer for rock band Poison.
The band has sold more than 50 million albums worldwide and 15 million records in the United States alone.

Biography
Richard Allan Ream was born on August 8, 1961, in Mechanicsburg, Pennsylvania, the youngest of two children of Norman and Margaret Ream. He attended Cedar Cliff High School in Camp Hill. Before founding Poison with vocalist Bret Michaels, Rockett worked as a hairdresser, lifeguard, dishwasher, emergency medical technician and a suit salesman.

In late 1993, Rockett discovered that the then guitarist Richie Kotzen of Poison was having a relationship with Deanna Eve, Rockett's fiancée at the time. Kotzen was fired due to this incident. In VH1's Behind the Music, singer Bret Michaels said he never wanted to speak to Kotzen again.

In 1995 Rikki co-created and coloured the 6 issue comic book series, Sisters Of Mercy, published by Maximum Press.

After almost 20 years with Poison, Rockett released his first solo album Glitter 4 Your Soul on January 7, 2003 which was distributed online. The album was a tribute to 1970s glam rock. He also guested on Britny Fox's Bite Down Hard.

On April 26, 2007, Rockett announced the creation of Rockett Drum Works Inc. It is a drum manufacturing company, specializing in the creation of ultra custom drum kits, snare drums and custom accessories. Prior to setting up his enterprise, Rockett worked for Chop Shop Custom Drum. He departed after conflicting opinions with Chop Shop founder Brian Cocivera. Rockett recruited most of the staff from Chop Shop along with some newer staff members.

In 2015 Rockett co-formed a new rock supergroup the Devil City Angels with guitarist Tracii Guns (L.A. Guns), bassist Eric Brittingham (Cinderella) and vocalist and rhythm guitarist Brandon Gibbs (Cheap Thrill).
Their self-titled debut album was officially released September 11, 2015.

Personal life
In October 2008, Rockett married longtime girlfriend Melanie Martel. On July 14, 2009, they had their first child, Jude Aaron Rockett. On March 2, 2013, Rikki and Melanie had their second child, a daughter named Lucy Sky. Both children are named after The Beatles' songs "Hey Jude" and "Lucy in the Sky with Diamonds". They separated in July 2015 and their divorce became final in June 2017.

Rockett holds a black belt in Brazilian Jiu-Jitsu, under trainer Renato Magno and trains at Street Sports Brazilian Jiu Jitsu, located in Santa Monica, California.

Rockett is a vegan.

In December 2015, Rockett announced that he had been battling throat cancer. In July 2016, he reported that he is now cancer-free. In July 2021, Rikki celebrated the fact that he is still cancer free, six years after the original diagnoses.

Discography

Solo
 Glitter 4 Your Soul (2003)

Poison
 Look What the Cat Dragged In (1986)
 Open Up and Say...Ahh! (1988)
 Flesh & Blood (1990)
 Swallow This Live (1991)
 Native Tongue (1993)
 Poison's Greatest Hits: 1986-1996 (1996)
 Crack a Smile...and More! (2000)
 Power to the People (2000)
 Hollyweird (2002)
  Best of Ballads & Blues (2003)
 The Best of Poison: 20 Years of Rock (2006)
 Poison'd (June 2007)
 Live, Raw & Uncut (2008)
 Poison – Box Set (2009)
 Double Dose: Ultimate Hits (2011)

Devil City Angels
 Devil City Angels (2015)

References

External links

 Rikki Rockett official site
 Rockett Drum Works official site
 Poison official site

1961 births
Living people
American activists
American rock drummers
Glam metal musicians
Musicians from Pennsylvania
People from Mechanicsburg, Pennsylvania
Poison (American band) members
20th-century American drummers
American male drummers
20th-century American male musicians